Mount Russell is a village in Inverell Shire of New South Wales in Australia. In the  the village and surrounding area had a population of 237.

A railway station on the Inverell branch opened on 10 March 1902, and was served by railmotors between Moree and Inverell. This section of the line was closed in 1987 and little trace remains of the station or platform, although some sidings are still intact. The silo owned by GrainCorp was no longer in use as of 2007.

References

Towns in New South Wales
Regional railway stations in New South Wales
Inverell Shire